Ouija is a 2014 American supernatural horror film directed by Stiles White in his directorial debut, produced by Jason Blum, Michael Bay, Andrew Form, Bradley Fuller, and Bennett Schneir and written by Juliet Snowden and White, who previously together wrote The Possession. It stars Olivia Cooke, Daren Kagasoff, Douglas Smith, and Bianca A. Santos as teenagers who have unleashed spirits from a Ouija board.

Ouija was released on October 24, 2014, by Universal Pictures. The film was a commercial success, grossing $103.6 million worldwide over a $5–8 million budget, but was overwhelmingly panned by critics, with many criticizing its performances, inconsistent tone, characters and story. A prequel, Ouija: Origin of Evil, was released in 2016, and was far better critically received.

Plot
Debbie Galardi recalls playing Ouija with her best friend Laine Morris as children. In present day, she throws her Ouija board into the fire and implies to Laine that something strange happened with the board. After Laine leaves, the Ouija board reappears in Debbie's bedroom. Debbie becomes possessed and hangs herself inside her home.

Laine attends Debbie's wake with her boyfriend Trevor, younger sister Sarah, friend Isabelle, and Debbie's boyfriend Pete. The five friends meet at Debbie's house and use her Ouija board to try communicating with her. Strange things happen, and a presence smashes Pete's hand and face into a mirror. The friends start finding the phrase "Hi friend" (a message communicated during the Ouija board session) written in different places, like Isabelle's car and Pete's desk. Thinking Deb is trying to communicate with them, they have another Ouija session and discover that they are actually in contact with a spirit calling itself "DZ". Laine sees the image of a little girl with her mouth sewn shut. The girl warns them to run because her mother is coming. Laine later learns that Deb found the Ouija board in her attic and played alone.

Isabelle is possessed and killed. Laine and Pete search Deb's attic and find a box of old photographs that belonged to the previous residents. While researching the previous family's history, they learn of a little girl named Doris Zander who went missing. Doris' sister Paulina, now an old woman committed to a psychiatric hospital, explains that her mother was a medium and used Doris as a vessel for the dead to speak through. Their mother went mad and sewed Doris' mouth shut, killing her. She tells Laine that there is a secret room in the house where Laine must find Doris' hidden body and unstitch her mouth in order for the girl to banish their mother. The friends go back to the Galardi house, where Laine finds Doris' corpse and cuts the stitches on her mouth. Doris' mother's spirit protests, but Doris chases away the ghost. Pete becomes possessed and is killed.

Laine revisits Paulina, realizing that she was in allegiance with Doris all along and had intentionally lied. Doris is the evil entity and her mother was trying to stop the friends from summoning her. Laine's grandmother, Nona, advises the sisters to destroy Doris' body and the Ouija board. Doris' ghost drowns Trevor and captures Sarah to sew her mouth shut. Laine plays the Ouija board alone to draw the spirit's attention. Doris starts possessing Laine, but Debbie's ghost helps Laine defeat Doris. Sarah and Laine throw Doris' body and the Ouija board into the furnace, stopping the paranormal activity. Later, Laine finds that the planchette has mysteriously appeared back at her home.

Cast

 Olivia Cooke as Laine Morris
 Afra Sophia Tully as young Laine
 Ana Coto as Sarah Morris
 Izzie Galanti as young Sarah
 Daren Kagasoff as Trevor
 Bianca Santos as Isabelle
 Douglas Smith as Pete
 Shelley Hennig as Debbie Galardi
 Claire Beale as young Debbie
 Sierra Heuermann as Doris Zander
 Sunny May Allison as young Doris
 Lin Shaye as Paulina Zander
 Claudia Katz Minnick as Mother / Alice Zander
 Vivis Colombetti as Nona
 Robyn Lively as Mrs. Galardi
 Matthew Settle as Anthony Morris

Production

Development
Ouija began development in May 2008 with Universal Pictures attached. David Berenbaum was hired to write the script, while Michael Bay, Andrew Form, and Bryan Fuller of Platinum Dunes were slated to produce. In October 2010, the studio had set a release date of November 21, 2012. That same month, Adam Horowitz and Edward Kitsis had written a new script, while Sylvain White, Scott Stewart, and Pierre Morel were in talks to direct. The film was described as a "four-quadrant supernatural adventure" akin to The Mummy and Indiana Jones. By December, the studio had passed on all pitches from the aforementioned filmmakers, including John Moore, and were now considering McG and Breck Eisner to direct. The next month, McG was set to direct. In April, Evan Spiliotopoulos was hired for rewrites when Horowitz and Kitsis where tied to other commitments. In June, Simon Kinberg, who previously wrote This Means War for McG, was brought in for further revisions. In August, Universal abandoned Ouija due to its "tentpole level" budget, leading to the film's producers meeting with Paramount Pictures and 20th Century Fox. Kinberg's draft would have cost $125 million to produce. In October, Hasbro Studios opted to restructure the film to accommodate a lower budget. Marti Noxon was hired to rewrite the script, in order to tone down the film's scale and instead craft a "more intimate, atmospheric -- and scary -- movie". Following the project's reconfiguration, McG was no longer involved while Jason Blum of Blumhouse Productions and Universal boarded the film in March 2012. A 2013 release window and a $5 million budget were instated. In July 2012, Juliet Snowden and Stiles White were hired to write a new screenplay with White directing.

Pre-production
Across December 2013, Olivia Cooke, Douglas Smith, Bianca Santos, Erin Moriarty, Ana Coto, Vivis Colombetti, Daren Kagasoff, and Matthew Settle joined the cast.

Filming
Principal photography began mid December 2013 in Los Angeles wrapped in January 2014.

Reshoots took place in May 2014 after a poor test screening, which, according to Olivia Cooke, resulted in half the film being re-shot. With the reshoots, Lin Shaye was added to the film to play a newly written character, Erin Moriarty's character was removed from the film entirely, and new plot points were added or changed entirely. The most notable of changes included the character of Doris Zander's physical appearance changing from that of a burnt looking girl to a rotting, decomposing girl with stitches in her mouth. Mike Flanagan contributed ideas to the film prior to reshoots but denied directing the film in any capacity. Flanagan also affirmed the film had a "rough journey to completion" and "a long post-production phase".

Release

Theatrical
Universal released Ouija in the United States on October 24, 2014. A tie-in novelization for the film by Katharine Turner was released on September 16, 2014.

Home media
Ouija was released in the US on DVD and Blu-ray on February 3, 2015.

Reception

Box office
In North America, the film was released to 2,858 theaters and earned $19,875,995 on its opening weekend (including its $911,000 gross on Thursday preview nights and $8.3 million on its opening day). at an average of $7,000 per theater, debuting at number one at the box office ahead of newly released John Wick ($14.2 million). The film played 75% under-25 years old and 61% female on its opening weekend.

Ouija was released in five international markets and earned $1.3 million from 234 screens. The film went to number two in Malaysia ($545,000), number four in Taiwan ($331,000), number two in Singapore ($238,000) and also number four in Poland ($137,000). In its second weekend the film earned $5.7 million from 1,166 screens in 19 territories for a two weekend international total of $7.7 million. It went to number one in the UK, Indonesia and the Philippines. In the UK, the film earned $2.2 million on its opening weekend, which is the second biggest opening weekend for a horror film in 2014 only behind Annabelle ($3.1 million). Ouija made a domestic total of $50,856,010 and $52,618,000 overseas, for a worldwide total of $103,674,010.

Critical response
According to the review aggregator website Rotten Tomatoes, 5% of critics have given the film a positive review based on 91 reviews, with an average rating of 3.2/10. The website's critics consensus states: "Slowly, steadily, although no one seems to be moving it in that direction, the Ouija planchette points to NO." Metacritic, another review aggregator which assigns and normalizes scores of critic reviews, gave the film a weighted average score of 38 out of 100 based on reviews from 22 critics, indicating "generally unfavorable reviews". Audiences surveyed by CinemaScore gave the film a "C" grade.

Novelization
The film was novelized by Katharine Turner. The novel was released on September 16, 2014.

The plot of the novel differs from the movie in many notable ways, containing an additional flashback sequence at the beginning of the book which occurs two months before Debbie dies, giving a more in-depth backstory to the main characters. Laine's father has a larger role in the novel, snapping at Sarah after she tries to sneak out of the house. There is an additional scene in the novel after the group uses the Ouija board for a second time where Sarah and Laine have a heartfelt conversation at the dinner table. There are longer sequences with Laine's grandmother Nona as well.

The message "Hi friend" from Doris in the novel appears as "Hi frend". When Isabelle approaches her car after work, instead of finding "Hi friend" written in the condensation on the inside of her car, she finds a hand print.

The characters of Pete and Isabelle also die in different ways in the novel. Pete, after seeing Doris' spirit in his room and becoming possessed, slits his wrists with an X-ACTO knife. Isabelle, after being possessed by Doris, sits in her bathtub with a plugged-in hair dryer, electrocuting herself.

The finale of the novel differs greatly from the film. Sarah is not trapped in the altar room with Doris' spirit as in the film, but rather Laine crawls down the passageway into the altar to get Doris' body. While Laine is in the passageway, Sarah is left by the furnace with the Ouija board where Doris manipulates Sarah's arm and has it twist in unnatural positions while touching the planchette. Doris uses Sarah's arm to spell out "D-I-E-F-R-E-N-D" on the board. After throwing Doris' body into the furnace with the Ouija board, Doris appears in spirit form as a normal girl, where her mother joins her. The two hold hands and disappear. Laine suddenly notices Debbie's spirit in the room. She says "Hi friend" to Laine. Laine asks if she is dead, but Debbie tells her everything is okay. Debbie says goodbye to Laine, and Laine falls unconscious.

The epilogue to the novel mirrors the film, with Laine finding the planchette in her room.

Prequel

Throughout January 2015, reports of a sequel were announced. In February 2015, it was confirmed the film was in development and had no release date. Jason Blum stated "We're a ways away ..." In April 2015, it was announced that the sequel would be released on October 21, 2016. Mike Flanagan would direct and co-write the sequel with his Oculus co-writer Jeff Howard. The film would be produced by Michael Bay, Brad Fuller, Andrew Form, Jason Blum, Brian Goldner, and Stephen Davis. Annalise Basso and Kaylee Procter would star in the sequel. It was then announced that Ouija: Origin of Evil would serve as a prequel to the first film. It was released in the United States on October 21, 2016, and unlike its predecessor, it gained far more positive reviews.

See also
 List of ghost films
 Jumanji
 Zathura: A Space Adventure

References

External links
 
 
 
 
 

2014 3D films
2014 directorial debut films
2014 films
2014 horror thriller films
2010s ghost films
2010s supernatural horror films
2010s supernatural thriller films
2010s teen horror films
American 3D films
American ghost films
American horror thriller films
American supernatural horror films
American supernatural thriller films
American teen horror films
Blumhouse Productions films
Films about board games
Films based on games
Films based on Hasbro toys
Films directed by Stiles White
Films produced by Andrew Form
Films produced by Bradley Fuller
Films produced by Jason Blum
Films produced by Michael Bay
Films scored by Anton Sanko
Films set in 2014
Films shot in Los Angeles
Films with screenplays by Stiles White
Hasbro Studios films
Platinum Dunes films
Universal Pictures films
2010s English-language films
2010s American films